Dendrocoris is a genus of stink bugs in the family Pentatomidae. There are about 11 described species in Dendrocoris.

Species
These 11 species belong to the genus Dendrocoris:
 Dendrocoris arizonensis Barber, 1911
 Dendrocoris contaminatus Uhler, 1897
 Dendrocoris fruticicola Bergroth, 1891
 Dendrocoris humeralis (Uhler, 1877)
 Dendrocoris maculosus Thomas
 Dendrocoris nelsoni
 Dendrocoris neomexicanus
 Dendrocoris parapini Nelson, 1957
 Dendrocoris pini Montandon, 1893
 Dendrocoris reticulatus Barber, 1911
 Dendrocoris variegtus Nelson

References

Further reading

 
 

Pentatomidae genera
Articles created by Qbugbot
Pentatomini